John Rolle may refer to:

John Rolle (1522–1570), founder of the great Rolle family of Stevenstone
John Rolle (born 1563), MP elected to the English parliament in 1601
John Rolle (Parliamentarian) (1598–1648), English Member of Parliament for Callington 1626-8 and Truro 1640-8
John Rolle (died 1706) (1626–1706), English Member of Parliament for Barnstaple 1660 and Devon 1661–1679
John Rolle (1679–1730), British Member of Parliament for Devon, 1710–1712, and Exeter, 1713–1715 and 1722–1727 
John Rolle, 1st Baron Rolle (1756–1842), British Member of Parliament for Devon, 1780–1786